William or Bill Saunders may refer to:

Science
 William Saunders (physician) (1743–1817), Scottish physician, first president of Royal Medical and Chirurgical Society
 William Wilson Saunders (1809–1879), British entomologist
 William Saunders (botanist) (1822–1900), American botanist and architect
 William Saunders (scientist) (1836–1914), Canadian pharmacist, entomologist, and plant breeder
 William Lawrence Saunders (1856–1931), American mining engineer and chairman of Ingersoll Rand
 William Edwin Saunders (1861–1943), Canadian naturalist

Sports
 Bud Saunders (1884–?), American football and basketball coach
 William B. Saunders (1896–1977), American football, basketball, and baseball coach
 Bill Saunders (1898–1950), American college football coach
 Billy Saunders (born 1937), Canadian ice hockey player
 Billy Joe Saunders (born 1989), British boxer
 William Saunders (footballer) (fl. 1900), football goalkeeper for Burslem Port Vale

Other
 William Saunders (died 1570), MP for Gatton and Surrey
 William Saunders (builder) (1767–1861), American architect
 William Saunders (poet) (1806–1851), Welsh poet writing in Welsh
 William Saunders (Liberal politician) (1823–1895), British newspaper publisher and Liberal Party politician
 William Saunders (photographer) (1832–1892), British photographer
 William Gualbert Saunders (1837–1923), English designer of stained glass
 William L. Saunders (1835–1891), colonel in the U.S. Civil War and North Carolina secretary of state
 William Penman Saunders (1912–1980), business manager and politician in Newfoundland, Canada

See also 
 William Sanders (disambiguation)